Mariam Shahriar (born November 7, 1966) is an Iranian film director and scriptwriter who achieved critical acclaim with her first feature film Daughters of the Sun.

Biography
Shahriar was born on November 7, 1966, in Tehran. Originally intending to study architecture in Italy, she instead travelled to the United States during the Iran–Iraq War. She studied cinema at California State University, Northridge after watching Fellini's 8½.  After graduating, she moved to Rome, Italy and continued studying for her MFA at American University. She worked in the Italian film industry as assistant director and editor.

She returned to Iran when her mother became gravely ill. There she was encouraged by famed Iranian director Abbas Kiarostami to write a story for a film project and apply to become a member of the Directors Guild. The first script could not be filmed in time so she came up with the concept for her first feature film Daughters of the Sun.

Daughters of the Sun, filmed in 2000, is about a rural girl, Aman, whose father shaves her hair and dresses her as a boy to work in a rug-making factory in order to support her family. Soon after, a female colleague, believing her to be a boy, falls in love with her and asks her to run away together so her parents won't marry her off to a much older man.  Aman has very little time to answer to either save herself or her friend from the misery of a horrific fate. 

Daughters of the Sun won several major festival awards including Best Film at Montreal International Film Festival and Best Film at Bratislava International Film Festival. . David Sterritt wrote that it is "[a]cted as a drama, paced like a ritual, filmed as a slice of rural Iranian life." Sheri Whatley regarded the film as a courageous political act: "This portray of a woman with not only her head uncovered, but shaved is quite a brazen act for a director."

Filmography

 All My Dreams Come True (1986, short)
 In Search of a Lost Dream (1986, short)
 Mommy, Don't Cry (1987, short)
 Lost Love (1990, short)
 Angelica é una brava ragazza (1997, short)
 Dokhtaran Khorshid / Daughters of the Sun (2000, feature)

References

1966 births
Living people
Iranian film directors
People from Tehran
Iranian women film directors
University of California alumni